Juan de Guevara or Giovanni Guevara (died August 1641) was a Roman Catholic prelate who served as Bishop of Teano (1627–1641).

Biography
Juan de Guevara was a professed religious of the Order of Clerics Regular Minor who was elected Superior General of the Order from 1619 to 1627.

On 22 March 1627, he was appointed during the papacy of Pope Urban VIII as Bishop of Teano.
On 11 April 1627, he was consecrated bishop by Luigi Caetani, Cardinal-Priest of Santa Pudenziana, with Antonio Santacroce, Titular Archbishop of Seleucia in Isauria, and Pietro Francesco Montorio, Bishop Emeritus of Nicastro, serving as co-consecrators. 
He served as Bishop of Teano until his death on August 1641.

References

External links and additional sources
 (for Chronology of Bishops) 
 (for Chronology of Bishops) 

17th-century Italian Roman Catholic bishops
Bishops appointed by Pope Urban VIII
1641 deaths